Luc Thériault  (born January 31, 1960) is a Canadian academic and politician. As a member of the Parti Québécois, he served as a Member of the National Assembly of Quebec from 2003 to 2007, representing the Masson electoral district. In 2015, he was elected to the Canadian House of Commons representing Montcalm, as a member of the Bloc Québécois. He served as the Bloc Québécois House Leader from 2015 until 2017, and was the party's representative on the Special Committee on Electoral Reform.

Thériault, along with six other Bloc MPs, resigned from the Bloc's caucus to sit as an independent MP on February 28, 2018 citing conflicts with the leadership style of Martine Ouellet. He rejoined the Bloc Québécois caucus on September 17, 2018.

Life and career
Thériault was born in Montreal. He attended Université du Québec à Montréal, earning a bachelor's degree in philosophy in 1984 and a Masters in political philosophy in 1988. He later earned a DESS in bioethics at the Université de Montréal in 2002.

After obtaining his master's degree, he taught philosophy at Collège de Maisonneuve from 1985 to 2003. He also coached water polo from 1979 to 1988.

He served as a member of the Ethics Committee of the Maisonneuve-Rosemont Hospital and Jeanne-Le Ber nursing home from 2000 to 2003. He was a member of the Board of Directors of the Maisonneuve Cooperative School (Coopérative scolaire Maisonneuve) from 2001 to 2003.

He was bureau chief for Parti Québécois in Ville-Marie, Montreal from 1999 to 2003. He was elected in the 2003 Quebec general election, succeeding Gilles Labbé. He was defeated in the 2007 Quebec general election by Ginette Grandmont.

Electoral record

Federal

Provincial

Municipal

References

External links

Luc Thériault biography via National Assembly of Quebec

Living people
1960 births
Academics from Montreal
Parti Québécois MNAs
Bloc Québécois MPs
Canadian educators
Canadian philosophers
Members of the House of Commons of Canada from Quebec
Politicians from Montreal
Université du Québec à Montréal alumni
Université de Montréal alumni
21st-century Canadian politicians
Québec debout MPs
People from Mascouche